Nice N' Wild, also known as Nice & Wild, was a U.S. freestyle music group that rose to fame in 1986 after their release of "Diamond Girl".

Band members included David Torres, Reggie Pierre and Remy Palacios. Although these three bandmates "performed" the song publicly, they did not sing the original vocals for "Diamond Girl", rather lip syncing the song's vocals during performances. However, David Torres did sing the Spanish parts himself after completing vocal training. The final vocal track on the hit recording was performed by John Minnis (with David L Cook having sung the demo vocal). Because of mistitled videos on the internet, many believe that Stevie B is the original vocalist of the song, but that of course is false. The song was written and produced by Arthur Lammoglia and Joe Granda in 1986.

"Diamond Girl" was featured on the band's debut full-length album, Energy, Love and Unity, released the following year (1987).  The album also featured follow-up singles "Obsession" and "Oh Baby (I Want to Make Love Tonight)", which were less successful than the debut hit.  Nearly a decade later, the band released a follow-up album, Infatuation, again featuring Minnis prominently as the lead vocalist, along with songwriting contributions from Granda, who also served as executive producer for the project. Despite the title track and a cover of the Bill Withers classic "Ain't No Sunshine" being released as singles, further commercial success proved elusive.

Discography

Albums
 Energy, Love and Unity (LP, Atlantic, 1987)
 Infatuation (CD, Right Touch Production, 1996)

Singles and EPs
 "Diamond Girl" (Top Hits, 1986)
 "Obsession" (Atlantic, 1987)
 "Oh Baby (I Want to Make Love Tonight)" (7", promo, Atlantic, 1987)
 "Infatuation"(Freestyle Records, 1995)
 "Ain't No Sunshine" (12", Right Touch Production, 1996)

References

Atlantic Records artists
American Eurodance groups
American dance music groups
Musical groups established in 1986
Musical groups disestablished in 1987
American musical trios